Nathaniel Friend House is a historic home located at Petersburg, Virginia. It was built in 1815–1816, and is a -story, six bay, Federal style brick commercial / residential building.  It has a rear ell that may incorporate the original kitchen and smokehouse.  The house was built by the wealthy import-export merchant, Nathaniel Friend, Jr., who also served as the Mayor of Petersburg in 1812–13.

It was listed on the National Register of Historic Places in 1976. It is located in the Petersburg Old Town Historic District.

References

External links

Nathaniel Friend Jr. House, 27-29 Bollingbrook Street, Petersburg, Petersburg, VA: 4 photos and 7 data pages at Historic American Buildings Survey

Historic American Buildings Survey in Virginia
Houses on the National Register of Historic Places in Virginia
Federal architecture in Virginia
Houses completed in 1816
Houses in Petersburg, Virginia
National Register of Historic Places in Petersburg, Virginia
Individually listed contributing properties to historic districts on the National Register in Virginia
1816 establishments in Virginia